Himalcoelotes is a genus of Asian funnel weavers first described by X. P. Wang in 2002. They are mostly found in China and Bhutan.

Species
 it contains thirteen species:

Himalcoelotes aequoreus Wang, 2002 – Nepal
Himalcoelotes brignolii Wang, 2002 – Bhutan
Himalcoelotes bursarius Wang, 2002 – Nepal
Himalcoelotes diatropos Wang, 2002 – Nepal
Himalcoelotes gyirongensis (Hu & Li, 1987) – China, Nepal
Himalcoelotes martensi Wang, 2002 – Nepal
Himalcoelotes pirum Wang, 2002 – Nepal
Himalcoelotes sherpa (Brignoli, 1976) – Nepal
Himalcoelotes subsherpa Wang, 2002 – Nepal
Himalcoelotes syntomos Wang, 2002 – Nepal
Himalcoelotes tortuous Zhang & Zhu, 2010 – China
Himalcoelotes xizangensis (Hu, 1992) – China
Himalcoelotes zhamensis Zhang & Zhu, 2010 – China

References

External links

Agelenidae
Araneomorphae genera
Spiders of Asia